KADB-LP (96.7 FM) was a low-power FM radio station licensed to Ada, Oklahoma, United States. The station was owned by Pontotoc Educational Radio.

KADB-LP's license was cancelled by the Federal Communications Commission on November 8, 2018, as the station had failed to renew its license before it expired on June 1, 2013.

References

External links

ADB-LP
Classical music radio stations in the United States
ADB-LP
Radio stations established in 2002
Ada, Oklahoma
Defunct radio stations in the United States
2002 establishments in Oklahoma
Radio stations disestablished in 2018
2018 disestablishments in Oklahoma
ADB-LP